Hundreds are unincorporated subdivisions of counties, equivalent to townships in some other states, and were once used as a basis for representation in the Delaware General Assembly. While their names still appear on all real estate transactions, they currently have no meaningful use or purpose except that non-renewable rental agreements for 120 days or less for dwellings located in Broadkill Hundred, Lewes-Rehoboth Hundred, Indian River Hundred and Baltimore Hundred are not subject to the Delaware Landlord-Tenant Code. The divisions, or "hundreds" as they are called, come from the times when  Delaware and Maryland were colonial holdings of Great Britain. While Delaware alone retains the use of "hundreds," the origin of most place names in both states can be traced back to the times of British rule.

New Castle County

Kent County

St. Jones Hundred was created in 1682 and was renamed Dover Hundred in 1823.
Dover Hundred was divided into East Dover Hundred and West Dover Hundred in 1859.
Murderkill Hundred was created in 1682 and was divided into North Murderkill Hundred and South Murderkill Hundred in 1855.

Sussex County

See also
List of counties in Delaware

References

The University of Delaware Library (2001).  The Hundreds of Delaware . Retrieved August 17, 2005.
The Delaware Genealogical research Guide (1997).  Delaware Counties and Hundreds. Retrieved August 17, 2005.
The Historical Society of Delaware.  Delaware Counties. Retrieved August 17, 2005.
The Historical Society of Delaware.  Delaware's Hundreds. Retrieved August 17, 2005.
Delaware State Archives/Historical Markers
 25 Del. C. § 5102.

 
Administrative divisions of the United States by state
Hundreds